Anthony Ulrich may refer to:

Anthony Ulrich, Duke of Brunswick-Wolfenbüttel (1633–1714) 
Duke Anthony Ulrich of Brunswick (1714–1776)